Social and political activism to raise awareness about HIV/AIDS, as well as to raise funds for effective treatment and care of people with AIDS (PWAs), has taken place in multiple nations across the world since the 1980s. As a disease that began in marginalized populations, efforts to mobilize funding, treatment, and fight discrimination have largely been dependent on the work of grassroots organizers directly confronting public health organizations (often government-managed medical bureaucracies) as well as politicians, drug companies, and other institutions.

Inaction from the Reagan administration in the US in the early 1980s, rampant homophobia, and the spread of misconceptions about HIV/AIDS led to outright discrimination against people with HIV/AIDS, especially in the early days of the AIDS pandemic. Protest movements like ACT UP arose to fight for the rights of PWAs and to work to end the pandemic. Methods of demonstration have included the writing of position papers and making posters, public marches and civil disobedience, candlelight vigils, die-ins, and many creative approaches to direct action, such as kiss-ins.

Methods and organizational structures

HIV/AIDS activism in the United States and Canada initially drew its numbers from the lesbian and gay community as a whole, including socially active patients who were struggling with their health themselves. As the pandemic progressed, friends and family of those diagnosed often joined in, along with allies from other communities.

In South Africa, the fight against HIV/AIDS began largely among patients only to grow to a concern among most of the nation's gay men and then to a broader coalition of South Africans fighting for anti-disease treatment as a part of a socio-economic right to healthcare.

Methods of protest have included marching with placards at appearances of political leaders or at Pride marches, leafletting, art projects, civil disobedience, hanging of political leaders in effigy, sit-ins, and die-ins. During die-ins, protesters lie motionless in the street, often blocking traffic, or in the aisles of a church (such as at ACT UP's 1989, Stop the Church action), to symbolize all the people who have died of AIDS.

In the U.S., the iconography of the inverted pink triangle (reclaimed gay pride symbol, originally utilized by Nazi Germany to mark gay men, much as the Yellow badge was used for Jews) and the slogan 'Silence=Death' together, is common. Artists and activists from the originating collective, and then later ACT UP have used posters and stickers of the image across New York City, then worldwide, during the worst times of the HIV/AIDS crisis in the 1980s. The image is now owned by ACT UP and members often wear it on t-shirts, buttons, and utilize it in various other types of media.

History of anti-disease activism by region

History of anti-disease activism in Africa

The widespread belief in various misconceptions about HIV/AIDS has resulted in a serious handicap holding back treatment in certain parts of Africa. Activists have worked in a variety of different nations to promote effective treatment and to fight back against the myth. One particular example that's drawn international media attention is the 'virgin cleansing myth', with some communities in Africa believing that sex with a un-experienced partner can cure either AIDS or the underlying HIV infection itself. Activist Betty Makoni is one particular individual who has repeatedly worked to dispel the myth; in 1999, she founded the charity Girl Child Network to support Zimbabwe's young sex abuse victims.

In terms of social activism against governments, the controversial 2014 Anti-Homosexuality Bill of Uganda, which aimed at making homosexual sex a criminal offense, earned condemnation from individual activists as well as from groups such as The Global Fund to Fight AIDS, Tuberculosis and Malaria. Said organization stated that excluding marginalised groups would compromise efforts to stop the spread of AIDS in Uganda, a social problem to the point that a full 5.4% of the adult population had been infected with HIV by the year 2007.

Struggles against HIV/AIDS have been a persistent problem in South Africa specifically, with over five million of the nation's people being HIV positive as of 2004 data. In the shadow of the collapsed apartheid system, the country-wide debate on the disease has focused on the intense conflict between social activists aligned with the Treatment Action Campaign (TAC) and the nation's government. Official support for AIDS denialism and the administering of what has been seen as inadequate access to HIV treatment outraged activists who viewed the government's policies as a denial of their basic right to life. Efforts by the TAC and associated individuals proved success when, in September 2003, the South African Cabinet finally instructed the country's health ministry to create a comprehensive HIV treatment and prevention plan. Later commentators have considered the TAC campaign as one of the most successful if not the most successful example of civil society pushing for human rights in South Africa since the end of apartheid.

HIV prevalence varies drastically from country to country inside Africa. For example, UNAIDS research in 2007 found that 23.9% of adults in Botswana had been inflected in comparison to the values of 12.5% in Mozambique and 2.8% in Rwanda. The South Africa and Zimbabwe had values of 18.1% and 15.3%, respectively.

History of AIDS activism in North America

In the United States, AIDS, which had not yet been named, came into the awareness of affected communities in the early 1980's, and reached critical mass by the mid 1980s.

Because of the long incubation period of HIV, which can go on for over a decade while symptoms of AIDS gradually appear, HIV was not noticed at first by health professionals or by those infected. By the time the first reported cases of a mysterious, fatal immune system condition were found in large U.S. cities such as New York City, the prevalence of infection had passed 5% in some communities.

The AIDS epidemic officially began on 5 June 1981, when the U.S. Centers for Disease Control and Prevention (CDC) issued findings in its Morbidity and Mortality Weekly Report newsletter of unusual clusters of pneumocystis pneumonia (PCP) caused by a form of pneumocystis carinii (now recognized as a distinct species titled pneumocystis jirovecii). The report looked specifically at five homosexual men in the Los Angeles area. Publications such as the San Francisco Chronicle and the Los Angeles Times gave the CDC's findings news coverage. June 1981 additionally saw the first AIDS patient getting received into care under the aegis of the U.S. National Institutes of Health (NIH). By August 1981, the CDC reported a full 108 cases of the new disease across America.

On July 27, 1982, a meeting of gay community leaders and activists met in Washington D.C. with representatives from the Centers for Disease Control (CDC) to pressure for a name change of the what was up till that point called GRID (gay-related immune deficiency). They proposed the term AIDS (Acquired Immune Deficiency Syndrome), as evidence by this point had made it clear that the virus was in no way limited to gay people. At this point the retrovirus itself had not yet been isolated. This would not happen till 1983, 
when it would initially be called by several names, including LAV and HTLV-III before being named HIV in 1986.

1982 also saw the first congressional hearing exploring the now renamed AIDS, called by Representative Henry Waxman of California. The CDC estimated at this point that tens of thousands would likely be affected by the disease. A change in terminology meant the proliferation of the new, CDC-coined name of Acquired Immune Deficiency Syndrome (AIDS).

That same year, a group of New Yorkers (Nathan Fain, Larry Kramer, Larry Mass, Paul Popham, Paul Rapoport, and Edmund White) officially established the Gay Men's Health Crisis (GMHC). An answering machine in the home of GMHC volunteer Rodger McFarlane, who later served as GMHC's first paid director, became the world's first AIDS hotline. It notably received over one hundred calls the first night. Besides functioning as a hub for social activism, GMHC established what are known as 'buddy programs' to provide people with AIDS with help during day-to-day events.

Also in 1982, activists Michael Callen and Richard Berkowitz published How to Have Sex in an Epidemic: One Approach. In this short, pioneering work on what was now being called "safer sex", they described ways gay men could be sexual and affectionate while dramatically reducing the risk of contracting or spreading HIV. Both authors, gay men living with AIDS, set out the booklet as one of the first times men were advised to use condoms and other barrier methods when having sexual relations with other men.

In 1983, the GMHC sponsored a benefit performance of the Ringling Bros. and Barnum & Bailey Circus, which served as the first major fund-raising event for AIDS. That same year, the official AIDS Candlelight Memorial was held for the first time. The organization Lambda Legal Defense and Education Fund filed the world's first AIDS discrimination suit, receiving assistance from the GMHC.

In 1984, Dianne Feinstein, then mayor of San Francisco, declared the first "AIDS Awareness Week" event. Featuring the primary goal of educating staff and students from San Francisco Community College District, it involved informing people about causes, effects, and symptoms of AIDS as well as prevention methods. 1984 additionally saw the very first laboratory isolation of HIV, the breakthrough coming the separate research efforts of Dr. Luc Montagnier in France and Dr. Robert Gallo in the U.S.

By 1985, publications such as Annals of Internal Medicine warned that "even if all transmission of the virus were to stop immediately, the... syndrome would continue to be a major public health problem for the foreseeable future." That year additionally saw the rise to prominence of HIV/AIDS activist Ryan White, an Indiana teenager with AIDS who got barred from his school due to his status, and his life's work of speaking out publicly against AIDS stigma and discrimination. White eventually succumbed to the disease in 1990, dying at the age of eighteen.

A form of HIV/AIDS activism that has received mainstream coverage has been the creation of and public showings of the AIDS Memorial Quilt. Conceived in 1985 by activist Cleve Jones during a candlelight march held in remembrance of the 1978 assassinations of San Francisco Supervisor Harvey Milk and Mayor George Moscone, the idea came about after Jones requested people write the names of loved ones who died due to AIDS-related causes on signs. Those were then taped to the old San Francisco Federal Building. The scene at the side of the building looked like an enormous patchwork quilt to Jones, and he felt inspired to try and make the concept into a reality. The quilt represented an inflection point within Jones' own life, as an  openly gay man who had suffered from internalized homophobia and thoughts of suicide in his earlier years. The first public display of the project was at San Francisco City Hall in 1987.

The most prominent HIV/AIDS activist group, ACT UP, got its start in 1987 at the Lesbian, Gay, Bisexual & Transgender Community Center in New York City. Larry Kramer spoke as part of a rotating series of speakers, and his well-attended, fiery speech focused on action to fight AIDS while condemning the Gay Men's Health Crisis (GMHC) group as not doing enough. Though a founder of GMHC, Kramer resigned due to his perceiving of the organization as politically impotent. During the 1980s and 1990s, ACT UP focused on direct action aimed at changing public policy. In a time of political inaction on AIDS, during the silence of the Reagan administration, the group became increasingly confrontational as larger numbers of gay men, in particular, were dying. The group also formed treatment action groups to put medical research and treatment into the hands of patient activists, as many hospitals were not treating People with AIDS, or not offering drug trials to those who wanted access. Many demonstrations were aimed at granting compassionate release of experimental treatments that the FDA was holding up in what ACT UP felt was excessive testing during a time of emergency.

For example, the group's 11 October 1988 protest picked up national media coverage as it successfully shut down the headquarters of the U.S. Food and Drug Administration (FDA) for a day. "Hey, hey, FDA, how many people have you killed today?" chanted a crowd estimated by ACT UP at between 1,100 and 1,500 people. The protesters additionally hoisted a black banner that simply read "Federal Death Administration" as well as hoisting an effigy of then President Ronald Reagan. The Atlantic later called it one of the most successful demonstrations during the time of the AIDS crisis.

That same year, funding for national, regional, and community-based organizations to fight HIV/AIDS began. (Comprehensive school-based education to begin teaching the young about the disease had started in 1987). Other changes due to activist pressure at the end of the 1980s were a reversal in the U.S. Department of Justice's decision making such that preventing discrimination against HIV patients became government policy plus a lowering of the price of AZT by 20%, the drug being one of the first effective treatments against HIV but having prohibitively massive costs at first. The former policy change became a matter of federal law in 1990 when President George H. W. Bush signed the Americans with Disabilities Act (ADA).

In terms of disease prevalence more generally, AIDS incidence increased rapidly through the 1980s only to peak in the early 1990s and subsequently decline into the dawn of the 21st century. Activism meant by the early 1990s the FDA started a process known as "accelerated approval" that got experimental yet promising drugs to individuals with AIDS faster.

In 2001, a CDC analysis of cases from 1981 through 2000 found that a full 774,467 persons had been reported with AIDS in the U.S. Of that total, 448,060 had died compared to 3542 persons with unknown vital status. The study's findings of 322,865 individuals living with AIDS were the highest ever reported. UNAIDS data collected in 2007 stated that 0.6% of adults in the U.S. had HIV in comparison to 0.4% of Canadian adults.

In the 2000's, the Obama administration issued a report finding that laws making HIV transmission a criminal offense do little to influence behavior while many "run counter to scientific evidence about routes of HIV transmission and effective measures of HIV prevention." In October 2018 California Governor Jerry Brown signed a bill into law that made knowingly exposing a sexual partner to HIV into a misdemeanor crime instead of a felony. WNYC labeled the change as "a legal and cultural milestone for the way Americans perceive HIV and AIDS."

The activist organization Treatment Action Group ((TAG) initially a subset of ACT UP New York) celebrated a victory in 2018 as well given that global spending on fighting tuberculosis hit a record high for 2017 compared to previous years. From 2016 to 2017, research spending jumped to $772 million from $726 million. TAG has spent years upon years pushing for better treatment of tuberculosis while taking careful note of the disease's status as a frequent problem for individuals with AIDS.

History of anti-disease activism in Europe

Cases of mysterious deaths in Europe during the early 1980s caused the proliferation of discrimination, fear, and stigma like in other areas. The World Health Organization (WHO) has remarked in a statement that "AIDS was—and in absolute, global terms still is—a stinging challenge to the values of modernity received, for better or worse, from Europe's Age of Enlightenment... [since] [a]ffluent, confident, gender-progressive, often social-democratic welfare states awoke, in the early 1980s, to an uncomfortable reminder of their human frailty." On example of the extreme reactions by some politicians is far-right French figure Jean-Marie Le Pen and his proposal of confining people with HIV/AIDS in prison-like facilities.

European politics have frequently involved championing the fight against HIV/AIDS as a human rights issue. Health care itself is also fundamentally seen as a matter of fundamental rights, requiring major government investment and regulation. Despite this, social changes have taken place since the world economic recession of the late 2000s that have shifted budgets' focus toward cost containment and increased efficiency.

One of the world's most important anti-disease events got started in central Europe. Held yearly on 1 December, World AIDS Day was first conceived in August 1987 by James W. Bunn and Thomas Netter. The two public information officers worked for the Global Programme on AIDS at the World Health Organization in Geneva, Switzerland.

Bunn later commented to NPR about his motivations at the time, stating that:

History of anti-disease activism in South America

The regions of Latin America and the Caribbean contains a significantly large number of HIV cases. According to data from UNAIDS, this goes all the way up to two million people living with the disease. HIV/AIDS activism has taken place under the atmosphere of pervasive media bias against those diagnosed, particularly given the use of language such as "contagion" and "infection" in non-medical contexts.

According to Luis E. Soto-Ramírez of Science:

As with Africa, HIV prevalence differs notably from country to country inside Latin America and the Caribbean, although the values don't vary to the extent as in between African nations. For example, UNAIDS research in 2007 found that 3.0% of adults in the Bahamas had been inflected in comparison to the values of 1.1% in the Dominican Republic and 0.1% in Cuba. When looking at new cases of infection, reporting presented at the International AIDS Conference held within Durban, South Africa in 2016 stated that only Chile and Uruguay managed to achieve a small reduction. Nations such as Argentina, Bolivia, Colombia, and Ecuador among others had data showing worsening trends.

Analysis of anti-disease activism

A 2018 report published by MD found that while efforts by ACT UP "arguably hastened the science, treatments and services for persons with HIV/AIDS", there still remained "found long-term effects on the activists" such as "concurrent posttraumatic stress responses and posttraumatic growth that are distinct from the experiences of persons affected by the illness but not involved with the campaign." However, the activists expressed gratitude for the opportunity to be a part of a close, positively-focused community.

The U.S. National Institutes of Health (NIH) has stated as an organization that the "pressure of activists demanding early access to promising AIDS treatments" prompted fundamental changes within it. Activists managed to bust "the 'ivory tower' mentality wide open and forever" altered the specific paths "the search for treatments at NIH is conducted". The organization has credited the activists both with pushing to have drugs in the experimental stage more widely available for patients as well as more broadly having made stopping AIDS a systematic research priority.

See also
AIDS Awareness Week
Cost of HIV treatment
"Free Me"
History of HIV/AIDS
HIV-positive people
How to Survive a Plague
Misconceptions about HIV/AIDS
NAMES Project AIDS Memorial Quilt
Timeline of early HIV/AIDS cases
World AIDS Day

References

Further reading

External links
"Why We Fight: Remembering AIDS Activism"
"AIDS 2018: What has happened to AIDS activism?"